Milanlu may refer to
Milanlı, Azerbaijan
Milanlu-ye Olya, Iran
Milanlu-ye Sofla, Iran
Milanlu Rural District, Iran